An Acceleron is a hypothetical subatomic particle postulated to relate the mass of the neutrino to the dark energy conjectured to be responsible for the accelerating expansion of the universe.

Accelerons are supposedly postulated at the University of Washington to relate the newfound mass of the neutrino to the dark energy conjectured to be accelerating the expansion of the universe.

References

Dark energy
Hypothetical elementary particles